Beaver Creek is a  tributary of the Conewago Creek in Adams County, Pennsylvania in the United States.

Beaver Creek joins Conewago Creek at East Berlin.

See also
List of rivers of Pennsylvania

References

External links
U.S. Geological Survey: PA stream gaging stations

Rivers of Pennsylvania
Tributaries of the Susquehanna River
Rivers of Adams County, Pennsylvania